Sir William Peter Rylands, 1st Baronet (23 October 1868 – 22 October 1948) was a British businessman.

Rylands was head of Rylands Brothers and served as High Sheriff of Cheshire in 1935. He was created a baronet, of Thelwall in the County Palatine of Chester, in 1939. He died in October 1948, one day before his eightieth birthday. The title died with him.

References

1868 births
1948 deaths
Baronets in the Baronetage of the United Kingdom
English businesspeople